Urve is an Estonian feminine given name. It is related to masculine name Urban. It may refer to any of the following persons:
Urve Kure (born 1931), chess player
Urve Manuel, Canadian glass artist
Urve Palo (born 1972), politician
Urve Tauts (born 1935), opera singer 
Urve Tiidus (born 1954), politician and television journalist
Urve Uusberg (born 1953), conductor and psychologist

References

Estonian feminine given names